Fliegel is a surname. Notable people with the surname include:

 Bernie Fliegel (1918–2009), American standout basketball player
 Gotthard Fliegel (1873–1947), German geographer
 Fritz Fliegel (1907-1941), German track cyclist, Luftwaffe bomber pilot and recipient of the Knight's Cross of the Iron Cross

 *Fliegal*
(Fictional dark fairy),Fairies that can enchant people and objects, Fliegals cannot produce light, origins unknown.